Makrem Ben Romdhane (alternate spellings: Makram, Macram) (born March 27, 1989) is a Tunisian professional basketball player for Benfica and . He can play at either the small forward, power forward or center positions.

Professional career
Romdhane played pro club basketball with Étoile Sportive du Sahel in the Tunisian Basketball League.  On 21 August 2013, Ben Romdhane signed with Murcia of the Spanish ACB League. He played there for one season, averaging 6 points in 32 games. He signed with Alexandria Sporting Club for the 2014–15 season. On July 25, 2017 he officially signed with Homenetmen Beirut.

Romdhane played in the 2021 BAL season with Monastir and was given the BAL Sportsmanship Award after the season. He was also named to the All-BAL First Team after helping Monastir reach the Finals of the inaugural season.

On 30 July 2021, Ben Romdhane signed with Benfica of the Liga Portuguesa de Basquetebol.

Tunisian national team
Romdhane is also a member of the senior men's Tunisian national basketball team, and made his debut for the senior team as a 20-year-old at the 2009 FIBA Africa Championship.  He saw action in three games off the bench for the Tunisians, who earned the bronze medal, and their first ever trip to the FIBA World Cup. He was part of the Tunisian team at the 2012 Summer Olympics. At 2015 AfroBasket, Makrem was named for the All-Tournament Team after leading Tunisia to the bronze medal.

He was named MVP of AfroBasket 2021 after helping Tunisia repeat and win the gold medal.

BAL career statistics

|-
|style="text-align:left;"|2021
|style="text-align:left;"|Monastir
| 6 || 6 || 28.4 || .611 || .417 || .333 || 7.3 || 3.8 || 1.3 || .3 || 13.2
|- class="sortbottom"
| style="text-align:center;" colspan="2"|Career
| 6 || 6 || 28.4 || .611 || .417 || .333 || 7.3 || 3.8 || 1.3 || .3 || 13.2

References

External links
Sports-Reference.com Profile
FIBA Profile
Eurobasket.com Profile

1989 births
Living people
2010 FIBA World Championship players
2019 FIBA Basketball World Cup players
Basketball players at the 2012 Summer Olympics
CB Murcia players
Centers (basketball)
Competitors at the 2013 Mediterranean Games
Étoile Sportive du Sahel basketball players
Liga ACB players
Mediterranean Games bronze medalists for Tunisia
Mediterranean Games medalists in basketball
Olympic basketball players of Tunisia
People from Sousse
Power forwards (basketball)
S.L. Benfica basketball players
Tunisian expatriate basketball people in Egypt
Tunisian expatriate basketball people in France
Tunisian expatriate basketball people in Lebanon
Tunisian expatriate basketball people in Spain
Tunisian men's basketball players
US Monastir basketball players